The 166th Infantry Regiment was an infantry regiment of the United States Army. It was part of the Ohio National Guard. In 1992, the regiment was consolidated with the 148th Infantry Regiment.

Mexican–American War and Civil War 
The 166th Infantry Regiment traces its history back to the Mexican–American War. On 23 June 1846, the 2nd Regiment, Ohio Volunteer Infantry was mustered into federal service at Camp Washington. The regiment was organized from companies in south-central Ohio. It mustered out of federal service a year later in New Orleans. It was reorganized and mustered into federal service again on 1 September 1847 at Camp Wool but mustered out on 26 July 1848 at Cincinnati. Between 1855 and 1861, the regiment was reorganized as independent companies in Ohio. In April 1861, it was reorganized at Camp Jackson as the 3rd and 4th Regiments, Ohio Volunteer Infantry. The 3rd was mustered in on 27 April and the 4th on 2 May for a three-month service period. Three year service term regiments with the same numerical designation were mustered in on 5 June for the 3rd and 12 June for the 4th at Camp Dennison. The 3rd Ohio Infantry was mustered out on 23 June 1864 in Cincinnati but the 4th Ohio Infantry was reorganized as the 4th Battalion, Ohio Volunteer Infantry, in June 1864. The 4th Battalion was mustered out on 12 June 1865 in Jeffersonville.

Interlude and Spanish–American War 
Between 1870 and 1877, the regiment was reorganized as independent companies based in south-central Ohio. During 1876 and 1877, the companies were consolidated as a result of labor unrest and became the 5th, 6th and 14th Infantry Regiments of the Ohio National Guard. On 27 July 1878, the 5th Infantry was consolidated into the 6th and 14th. The 6th and 14th were combined on 14 June 1890 to become the 14th Infantry Regiment. As a result of the outbreak of the Spanish–American War, the 14th Infantry was mustered into federal service on 9 May 1898 at Camp Bushnell as the 4th Ohio Volunteer Infantry. They were soon transferred to Camp George R. Thomas in Chickamauga Park, Georgia. The regiment became part of the Army of the Gulf. On 22 July, it embarked for Newport News and was loaded onto the SS Saint Paul. On 3 August, the regiment landed at Arroyo in Puerto Rico and fought in the Puerto Rican Campaign until the end of hostilities on 13 August. On 29 October, the 4th Ohio embarked on the SS Chester for the voyage back to America. After landing at New York City on 3 November, they were reviewed by President McKinley after being moved to Washington, D.C. The regiment was mustered out at Columbus on 20 January 1899. On 14 April, the regiment was disbanded. It was reorganized as the 4th Infantry Regiment of the Ohio National Guard on 14 July 1899.

World War I 

The regiment was mustered into federal service on 11 July 1916 in Camp Willis and mustered out on 3 March 1917 at Fort Wayne. On 15 July, the regiment was called into federal service due to the United States entry into World War I. It was drafted into federal service on 5 August. It was reorganized as the 166th Infantry Regiment on 20 August and assigned to the 42nd Infantry Division's 83rd Infantry Brigade. It arrived on the Western Front in February 1918 and fought until the end of the war on 11 November. The regiment participated in the Battle of Saint-Mihiel and the Meuse-Argonne Offensive. The regiment returned stateside and was demobilized on 17 May 1919 at Camp Sherman, Ohio.

Interwar and World War II 
Elements of the regiment consolidated with elements of the former 7th Ohio Infantry on 21 May 1920 to become the 4th Infantry Regiment, Ohio National Guard. with headquarters at Columbus. On 1 July 1921, the regiment was redesignated as the 166th Infantry and assigned to the 37th Infantry Division.

On 15 October 1940, it was inducted into federal service at Columbus. Ten days later, the 166th relocated to Camp Shelby, where it was relieved from assignment to the 37th Division on 16 January 1942, becoming a separate unit. The regiment moved to New Orleans, Louisiana on 12 February, and 1st Battalion was detached to Task Force 1291, serving as a garrison unit in Aruba and Curaçao in the Caribbean. The 166th was transferred to Fort Barrancas, Florida on 2 October 1942, without 1st and 2nd Battalions. On 15 April 1943, it returned to Camp Shelby and became part of the Third Army, where the 2nd Battalion rejoined the regiment. On 18 April 1943, the regiment was assigned to the Southern Defense Command at New Orleans, without the 2nd Battalion which was at Texas City. On August 20, 1943, the 166th Infantry Regiment was authorized to be reorganized; the 1st Battalion returned to the regiment without personnel on 1 September 1943, and a new 1st Battalion was formed. On 7 September, the regiment, less the 2nd Battalion (which was assigned to Camp Hood, Texas), was ordered to move to Fort Sill, Oklahoma. On 22 January 1944, the 166th Infantry Regiment, less the 2nd and 3rd Battalion and Company D, was inactivated at Fort Sill. The 3rd Battalion and Company D became part of the Replacement and School Command on 1 February 1944. The 2nd Battalion was inactivated on 22 February at Camp Hood, Company D was inactivated on 17 November 1944, and the 3rd Battalion was inactivated on 12 February 1945.

Cold War 
The 166th Infantry Regiment was reorganized on 11 November 1946 as part of the Ohio National Guard. On 1 September 1959, it became a parent regiment under the Combat Arms Regimental System. It consisted of the 1st Battle Group, part of the 37th Infantry Division. It was reorganized on 1 April 1963 to consist of the 1st Battalion, still part of the 37th. It was again reorganized on 15 February 1968 to consist of the 1st Battalion and was transferred to the 38th Infantry Division. It was transferred on 1 March 1977 to the 73rd Infantry Brigade. On 1 May 1989, it was withdrawn from the Combat Arms Regimental System and reorganized under the U.S. Army Regimental System. It was consolidated on 1 September 1992 with the 148th Infantry Regiment. The new unit, designated the 148th Infantry, consisted of the 1st Battalion of that regiment, part of the 73rd Infantry Brigade. Its new headquarters was at Lima, Ohio.

References

Citations

Bibliography

Further reading 

 

Infantry regiments of the United States Army National Guard
Infantry regiments of the United States Army
Military units and formations established in 1917
Military units and formations disestablished in 1992
United States Army regiments of World War I